Shotcut is a free and open-source, cross-platform video, audio, and image editing program for FreeBSD, Linux, macOS and Windows. Started in 2011 by Dan Dennedy, Shotcut is developed on the MLT Multimedia Framework, in development since 2004 by the same author.

Features 
Shotcut supports video, audio, and image formats via FFmpeg. It uses a timeline for non-linear video editing of multiple tracks that may be composed of various file formats. Scrubbing and transport control are assisted by OpenGL GPU-based processing and a number of video and audio filters are available.

 Format support through FFmpeg
Frame-accurate seeking for many formats
 Webcam and audio capture
 Network stream playback (HTTP, HLS, RTMP, RTSP, MMS, UDP)
 EDL (CMX3600 Edit Decision List) export

Audio 

 Audio scopes
Loudness
Peak meter
Waveform
Spectrum analyzer
 JACK transport sync

Video effects 

 HTML5 as source and filters
 Color grading tools
 De-interlacing
 Wipe transitions
 Track compositing/blending modes
 Speed and reverse effect for clips
 Keyframes

Hardware 

 Blackmagic Design SDI and HDMI for input and preview monitoring
 Leap Motion for jog/shuttle control
 Webcam capture
 Audio capture to system audio card
 Capture (record) SDI, HDMI, webcam (V4L2), JACK audio, PulseAudio, IP stream, and Windows DirectShow devices
 Multi-core parallel image processing (when not using GPU and frame-dropping is disabled)
 DeckLink SDI keyer output
 OpenGL GPU-based image processing with 16-bit floating point linear per color component

Other 
 Does not depend on system codecs
 Can run as a portable app from external drive
 Batch encoding with job control
 Stream (encode to IP) files and any capture source
 Video quality measurement (PSNR and SSIM)
 Perform integrity check of an audio/video file
 View detailed information about an audio/video file

History 
Shotcut was originally conceived in November 2004 by Charlie Yates, an MLT co-founder and the original lead developer. The current version of Shotcut is a complete rewrite by Dan Dennedy, another MLT co-founder and its current lead. Dennedy wanted to create a new editor based on MLT and chose to reuse the Shotcut name, since he liked it so much. He wanted to make something to exercise the new cross-platform capabilities of MLT, especially in conjunction with the WebVfx and Movit plugins.

See also 

 List of video editing software
 List of free video editing software
 Comparison of video editing software
 Non-linear editing system

References

External links 
 
 

Audio editing software for Linux
macOS audio editors
Video editing software for Linux
Video editing software for macOS
Video editing software for Windows
Free and open-source video-editing software
Software that uses FFmpeg